Part Ten (Part X) of the Constitution of Albania is the tenth of eighteen parts. Titled The Office of the Prosecutor, it consists of 13 articles. Together with Part Eight (Constitutional Court), and Part Nine (The Courts) underwent radical changes in 2016 during the so-called Justice Reform, which were the efforts of lawmakers to fight corruption, organized crime, nepotism in the justice system.

The Office of the Prosecutor

References

10